Rhamphorhynchus may refer to:

Rhamphorhynchus, a genus of pterosaur
Rhamphorhynchus, a former monotypic genus of orchid, containing only the species now called Aspidogyne mendoncae

simple:Rhamphorhynchus